Events from the year 1787 in art.

Events
 Seventeen-year-old Thomas Lawrence arrives in London and takes lodgings near Sir Joshua Reynolds.

Works

 Jacques-Louis David – The Death of Socrates (completed)
 Thomas Gainsborough
 Georgiana, Duchess of Devonshire
 Mrs. Richard Brinsley Sheridan
 Francisco Goya
 Highwaymen Attacking a Coach
 The Snowstorm (Winter)
 The Swing
 Louise Élisabeth Vigée Le Brun – Marie Antoinette and her Children (completed)
 Jacques-Antoine-Marie Lemoine – Portrait of a Woman with Her Son and Daughter in a Balcony Window
 George Romney – Mrs Jordan as Peggy
 Johann Heinrich Wilhelm Tischbein – Goethe in the Campagna

Awards
 (unknown)

Births
 January 7 – Patrick Nasmyth, Scottish landscape painter (died 1831)
 February 3 – Karl Joseph Brodtmann, Swiss artist, lithographer, printmaker, publisher and bookseller (died 1862)
 March 10 – William Etty, English painter, especially of nudes (died 1849)
 April 9 – William Finden, English line engraver (died 1852)
 August 17 – Maxim Vorobiev, Russian Romantic landscape painter (died 1855)
 August 20 – Jean-Pierre Cortot, French sculptor (died 1843)
 September 11 – Karl Wilhelm Wach, German painter (died 1845)
 September 18 – Johann David Passavant, German painter, curator and artist (died 1861)
 October 2 – Nicolas Gosse, French historical painter (died 1878)
 October 13 – William Brockedon, English painter (died 1854)
 November 18 – Louis Daguerre, French artist and chemist, recognized for his invention of the daguerreotype process of photography (died 1851)
 November 22 – Copley Fielding, English watercolour landscape painter (died 1855)
 December 16 – François Joseph Heim, French painter (died 1865)
 date unknown
 Heinrich Adam, German painter (died 1862)
 Giuseppe Bisi, Italian painter, mainly of landscapes (died 1869)
 Johannes Flintoe, Danish-Norwegian painter of Norwegian landscapes (died 1870)
 Harriet Gouldsmith, English landscape painter and etcher (died 1863)
 François-Joseph Navez, Belgian neo-classical painter (died 1869)
 Xavier Sigalon, French Romantic painter (died 1837)

Deaths
 February 4 – Pompeo Batoni, Italian painter (born 1708)
 March 17 – Anton August Beck, German engraver (born 1713)
 June 23 – Pierre L'Enfant, French painter (born 1704)
 July 25 – Arthur Devis – English portrait painter, particularly known for his conversation pieces and other such small portraits (born 1712)
 September 5 – John Brown, Scottish portrait-draftsman and painter at Edinburgh (born 1749)
 November 10 – Cristoforo Dall'Acqua, Italian painter and engraver (born 1734)
 December 12 – Jean Valade, French painter (born 1710)
 date unknown
 Mason Chamberlin, English portrait painter (born 1727)
 John Cheere, English sculptor (born 1709)
 Nicolas Desportes, French painter of hunting scenes (born 1718)
 Erik Westzynthius the Younger, Finnish painter (born 1743)
 Francesco Zugno, Italian Rococo painter (born c. 1708)
 probable - Thomas Engleheart, English sculptor and modeller in wax (date of birth unknown)

 
Years of the 18th century in art
1780s in art